This is a list of the National Register of Historic Places listings in Bullitt County, Kentucky.

It is intended to be a complete list of the properties and districts on the National Register of Historic Places in Bullitt County, Kentucky, United States.  The locations of National Register properties and districts for which the latitude and longitude coordinates are included below, may be seen in an online map.

There are 10 properties and districts listed on the National Register in the county.

Current listings

|}

See also

 List of National Historic Landmarks in Kentucky
 List of attractions and events in the Louisville metropolitan area

References

Bullitt County, National Register
Bullitt